Sorana Cîrstea was the defending champion, but chose to participate in the BGL Luxembourg Open instead.

Claire Feuerstein won the title, defeating Maryna Zanevska in the final, 7–5, 6–3.

Seeds

Main draw

Finals

Top half

Bottom half

External Links
 Main draw
 Qualifying draw

Open GDF Suez Region Limousin - Singles
Open de Limoges